Evergreen Point is the westernmost of a group of three small peninsulas on the east side of Lake Washington, King County, Washington. It is situated between the main body of the lake and Fairweather Bay. Most notable for being the namesake of the Evergreen Point Floating Bridge, it is part of the city of Medina.

See also
 Hunts Point
 Yarrow Point

References

Geography of King County, Washington
Seattle metropolitan area